The 1954 All-Ireland Senior Football Championship was the 68th staging of Ireland's premier Gaelic football knock-out competition.

Meath were the winners.

Note the Munster football championship did not have Quarter-Finals. Limerick did not take part (1953-1964) while Clare skipped a year.

Results

Connacht Senior Football Championship

Leinster Senior Football Championship

Munster Senior Football Championship
Note there were no Quarter-Final's were played Limerick didn't complete (1953-1964) while Clare decided to skip the Munster championships for just 1 year. This means that Kerry, Cork, Tipperary and Waterford would go on straight to the Semi-Final's with the winners of both matches qualify for the final.

Ulster Senior Football Championship

All-Ireland Senior Football Championship

Championship statistics

Miscellaneous

 Munster championship did not have Quarter-finals, due to Limerick 2nd year not taking part while Clare skipped the year.
 Galway end a 9 year wait for the Connacht football title.
 The All Ireland final was Meath's first ever win over Kerry in history.

References

All-Ireland Senior Football Championship